Andrea Ross, better known as Angel Corpus Christi, is a San Francisco-based singer, songwriter and accordionist, who records and performs with her husband, guitarist Rich Stim (of MX-80).

Career
Ross's first release was the I♥NY album, released by Criminal Damage Records in 1985. She followed this with the mini-LP Wake Up and Cry (1986) and the cassette-only Dim the Lights (1987), before returning three years later with Accordion Pop vol. 1.

In the mid-1990s, she signed to the major-backed label Almo Sounds, which issued White Courtesy Phone. It was produced by Craig Leon and features a guest appearance from Herb Alpert. 

In the late 1990s she recorded with Dean Wareham (formerly of Galaxie 500 and Luna) and Alan Vega (of Suicide), and played accordion on Spiritualized's 1997 album Ladies and Gentlemen We Are Floating in Space.

Her 2003 release, Divine Healer, features former Switchblade Symphony guitarist George Earth on guitar and bass, who also played guitar and drums on her 2005 Lou Reed tribute album, Louie Louie. In 2009, Angel, working with producer Dave Nelson, deconstructed seven Elvis Presley songs for her release, Elvis Elvis. In 2012, Angel released Angel Does X-tal, a five-song EP tribute to the San Francisco band, X-tal.

As well as writing and performing her own songs she has recorded cover versions by artists such as The Ramones, Suicide, Alice Cooper, Mötley Crüe, and Lou Reed.

Discography

Albums
 I♥NY (1984), Criminal Damage – reissued in 1999 by Munster
 Wake Up & Cry (1985), Criminal Damage
 Dim The Lights (1987), ENT
 Accordion Pop Volume 1 (1989), Stim
 The 80's (1989), Next Big Thing
 White Courtesy Phone (1994), Almo Sounds
 Divine Healer (2003), Gulcher Records
 Louie Louie (a tribute to Lou Reed) (2005), Gulcher Records
 Elvis Elvis (a tribute to Elvis Presley) (2009), a&r/ENT
 Angel Does X-tal (a tribute to X-tal) (2012), a&r/ENT
 Half Moon Fever  (a tribute to Tom Petty) (2015), a&r/ENT
 therealangelcorpuschristi (2018), Mono-Tone – compilation

Singles
 "Pull Girl"/"Ruff Tuff Creme Puff" (1992), a&r/ENT
 "Big Black Cloud"/"Candy" (1992),a&r/ENT
 "Been There Done That" (1995), Almo Sounds
 "Me and My Beretta" (1996), 3mv/Almo Sounds
 "Je T'aime" (with Dean Wareham)/"Cheree" (with Alan Vega)/"Surfer Girl" (1997), Via Satellite
 "Je T'aime (I Wanna Boogie With You)"/"Wild Bill" (with Dean Wareham) (1998), Munster
 "You"/"I Want Everything" (with Dean Wareham) (2001), Emma's House
 "I Love Baby" (2014), Emotional Rescue

References

External links
 
 Angel Corpus Christi at The Ectophiles' Guide

Year of birth missing (living people)
Living people
Musicians from California
21st-century accordionists